Mizanur Rahman Aryan (born 29 November 1991) is a Bangladeshi television director and scriptwriter who has directed the telefilm Boro Chele which is most viewed Bangladeshi telefilm in YouTube. He has directed more than 70 Dramas, telefilms and serial since 2012.

Biography

Early life and education 
Aryan was born in Cumilla. He was raised in Cumilla and completed his SSC from Cumilla Zilla School and HSC from Rifles Public College, Dhaka. He has a B.Sc degree in Textile Engineering.

Career 
Aryan began his career as a director in a television drama in 2012. His first hit drama Boro Chele crossed 36 million views on YouTube. There are so many hit numbers of his direction. "Boro Chele" and "Buker Ba Pashe" received Meril Prothom Alo Awards which are directed by him.

Television 
 Tumi Ami Shey (2012)
 Shponogulo Tai Oshompurono (2012)
 Megh Bristy Otopor (2012)
 Golpogulp Amader (2012)
 Jibon Ebong Kichu Shopno (2012)
 Golpota Tomar Amar (2012)
 Trump Card (2013)
 Shomvodon Tin Prokar (2013)
 Trump Card the Rise of Maria (2013)
 Lets Fly (2014)
 In A Relationship (2014)
 Couple (2014)
 Ekhono Ami (2015)
 Prem Tumi (2015)
 Angry Bird (2015)
 Amar Golpe Tumi (2015)
 Tai Tomake (2015)
 To Airport (2015) 
 Opekkhar Sesh Dine (2016)
 Shei Cheleta (2016)
 Shei Meyeta (2016)
 Prem Amar (2016)
 Utthshorgo (2016)
 Mr And Mrs (2016)
 Kothopokothon (2016)
 Twenty One Twenty Eight (2016)
 Fan Page (2016)
 15 Din (2017)
 Hate Rekhe Haat (2017)
 Tomar Amar Prem (2017)
 Batch 27 (2017)
 Batch 27 Last Page (2017)
 Boro Chele(2017)
 Thikana (2017)
 Forever (2018)
 Buker Ba Pashe (2018)
Golpogulo Amader (2018)
 Password (2018)
 Valo Theko Tumio (2019)
 Rini (2019)
 Mon Mondire (2019)
 Kokhono Na Kokhno (2019)
 Sesh Ki Hoyechilo Sotti (2019)
 Dekha Hobe ki (2019)
 Life Insurance (2019)
 Ronjona Ami Abar Ashbo (2019)
Shesta Sundor (2019)
 Tumi Amari (2019)
 Sharthopor (2020)
 A Sweet Love Story (2020)
 Bujh Balika Obujh Balok (2020)
 Protidin (2020)
 Charur Biye (2020) 
 Upohar (2020)

Filmography

Music videos 
 Evabe Chai (Shawon Gaanwala)
 Keu Na Januk (Tahsan)

Web Content 
Networker Baire
Unish20

References 

1991 births
Living people
Bangladeshi screenwriters
People from Comilla District
Bangladeshi television directors